James Hubbard (January 1884 – April 4, 1932) was an American Negro league outfielder between 1907 and 1910.

A native of Bessemer, Alabama, Hubbard made his Negro leagues debut in 1907 with the Birmingham Giants and played for Birmingham again the following season. He went on to play for the San Antonio Black Bronchos and Oklahoma Monarchs through 1910. Hubbard died in Acmar, Alabama in 1932 at age 48.

References

External links
Baseball statistics and player information from Baseball-Reference Black Baseball Stats and Seamheads

1884 births
1932 deaths
Date of birth missing
Birmingham Giants players
Oklahoma Monarchs players
San Antonio Black Bronchos players